Kysaiah Pickett (born 2 June 2001) is a professional Australian rules footballer playing for the Melbourne Football Club in the Australian Football League (AFL).

Pickett is the nephew of former Demons players Neville Jetta and Byron Pickett.

He was nominated for the 2020 AFL Rising Star award in round 11 of the 2020 AFL season.

Career
Kysaiah Pickett was selected by Melbourne with the 12th overall pick in the 2019 AFL Draft. Pickett was the second pick taken by Melbourne behind Luke Jackson. Melbourne received the pick from Freemantle. 

Kyasaia played 14 games in his debut season earning a Rising Star nomination in round 11 following Melbourne's 57-point win over North Melbourne, where Pickett kicked 1 goal 2 behinds and had 12 possessions.

In 2021, Pickett was a part of the Melbourne team playing every single game of the season. Pickett was also a part of the team that won the Grand Final, though he was held to four possessions and three tackles in the games

In 2022, Pickett played 23 games for Melbourne kicking 41 goals, missing only Melbourne's round 7 game against Hawthorn due to Health and Safety protocols. 

In 2023, Pickett kicked four goals in Melbourne's opening game of the season but was reported for a bump on Bulldog's player Bailey. The tribunal has already sentenced Pickett to a 2-game suspension for the bump, though the option to challenge still remains.

Statistics
Updated to the end of the 2022 season.

|-
| 2020 ||  || 36
| 14 || 7 || 13 || 62 || 47 || 109 || 17 || 35 || 0.5 || 0.9 || 4.4 || 3.4 || 7.8 || 1.2 || 2.5 || 0
|-
| scope=row bgcolor=F0E68C | 2021# ||  || 36
| 25 || 40 || 28 || 193 || 103 || 296 || 59 || 87 || 1.6 || 1.1 || 7.7 || 4.1 || 11.8 || 2.4 || 3.5 || 2
|-
| 2022 ||  || 36
| 23 || 41 || 18 || 180 || 59 || 239 || 55 || 62 || 1.8 || 0.8 || 7.8 || 2.6 || 10.4 || 2.4 || 2.7 || 4
|- class=sortbottom
! colspan=3 | Career
! 62 !! 88 !! 59 !! 435 !! 209 !! 644 !! 131 !! 184 !! 1.4 !! 1.0 !! 7.0 !! 3.4 !! 10.4 !! 2.1 !! 3.0 !! 6
|}

Notes

Honours and achievements
Team
 AFL premiership player: 2021
 McClelland Trophy: 2021

Individual
 22under22 team: 2021
 AFL Rising Star nominee: 2020 (Round 11)

References

External links

2001 births
Living people
Melbourne Football Club players
People educated at Prince Alfred College
Indigenous Australian players of Australian rules football
Australian rules footballers from Western Australia
Australian rules footballers from South Australia
Melbourne Football Club Premiership players
One-time VFL/AFL Premiership players